The Ukrainian Evangelical Baptist Convention of Canada is a Baptist organization serving the Ukrainian Baptists in the country of Canada.

History
Ukrainian Baptists became established in Canada early in the 20th century from two independent sources. A group of Ukrainian immigrant families laid down the foundation and established the first Ukrainian Baptist church in Canada, electing Rev. Ivan Shakotko to be the pastor in Winnipeg in 1903. Around the turn of the 20th century, English-speaking Baptists sent a missionary to labour among the growing Ukrainian population in western Canada. From this work, a church was organized in Overstone, Manitoba in 1904. Around this same time, Baptist work among Ukrainian Canadians was started in Toronto, and in Saskatchewan. John Kolesnikoff, a missionary, moved to Canada from eastern Ukraine in 1907. These churches were successful in attracting Mennonite, Shtundist, and Eastern Orthodox emigrants from Imperial Russia. The first annual conference of Ukrainian Baptists in Canada was organized by Rev. Shakotko and Rev. Kolesnikoff in Canora, Saskatchewan in 1908. It was originally called the "Russian-Galician Evangelical Convention" and gradually changed to "Russian-Ukrainian" as the name Ukrainian was popularized. For a number of years afterwards the body operated as the "Federation of Ukrainian Baptist Churches in Canada". In 1961, they incorporated under the current name.

See also
 Baptists in Ukraine
 Brotherhood of Independent Baptist Churches and Ministries of Ukraine
 All-Ukrainian Union of Churches of Evangelical Christian Baptists
 Fellowship of Evangelical Baptist Churches in Canada
 List of Baptist denominations
 Union of Slavic Churches of Evangelical Christians and Slavic Baptists of Canada

References
 Profiles in Beliefs: the Religious Bodies in the United States and Canada (Vol. II), by Arthur Carl Piepkorn
 100th Anniversary of the Ukrainian Evangelical Baptist Church, Winnipeg, Manitoba. Historical Review: 1903-2003. John Tkachuk, October 19, 2003. Retrieved 27 December 2022.
 The Stories of Michael Stepanovich Shakotko. Retrieved 27 December 2022.

Christian organizations established in 1908
Baptist denominations in North America
Ukrainian Canadian religion
Ukrainian Baptists
Evangelical denominations in North America
1908 establishments in Canada
Baptist Christianity in Canada